Above may refer to:

Above (artist), Tavar Zawacki (born 1981), contemporary urban artist
Above (magazine), an American environmental magazine 2009–2010
Above (Mad Season album), 1995
Above (Pillar album), 2000
Above (Samael album), 2009
"Above", a song by Finger Eleven from Tip

See also